John Granville may refer to:

 John Granville (diplomat),  American diplomat assassinated in Khartoum, Sudan
 John Granville, 1st Earl of Bath, English Royalist soldier and statesman
 John Granville, 1st Baron Granville of Potheridge, English soldier, landowner and politician
 John Granville (footballer), football goalkeeper from Trinidad and Tobago